Leonardo Federico Ramos Melgar (born 16 September 1991) is a Uruguayan footballer who plays as a midfielder for Deportivo Maldonado.

Career

Ramos started his career with Uruguayan second division side Miramar Misiones, helping them earn promotion to the Uruguayan top flight. In 2015, Ramos signed for Liga de Portoviejo in the Ecuadorean second division, where he said, "[the manager] asked us to infect the Ecuadorian players a little, because they were cold. For them it was the same to win as to lose and I with two other Uruguayans –Javier Guarino and Diego Torres– tried to change their mentality and we saved ourselves from relegation." 

Before the 2016 season, Ramos signed for Uruguayan second division club Atenas, where he made 50 league appearances and scored 11 goals. On 6 March 2016, he debuted for Atenas during a 2-4 loss to Rampla Juniors. On 27 March 2016, Ramos scored his first goal for Atenas during a 1-1 draw with Boston River.

before the 2017 season, he was sent on loan to Plaza Colonia in the Uruguayan top flight. Before the 2019 season, Ramos signed for Uruguayan second division team Deportivo Maldonado, helping them earn promotion to the Uruguayan top flight.

References

External links

 
 

Uruguayan footballers
People from Piriápolis
Living people
Expatriate footballers in Ecuador
Association football midfielders
1991 births
Uruguayan expatriate sportspeople in Ecuador
Atenas de San Carlos players
Miramar Misiones players
Club Plaza Colonia de Deportes players
Deportivo Maldonado players
Uruguayan Segunda División players
Uruguayan expatriate footballers
Uruguayan Primera División players